Sergio Frusoni (August 10, 1901 – May 29, 1975) was a poet and promoter of the Cape Verdean Creole language.

Biography
Sérgio  was born in Mindelo on the island of São Vicente, the son of Italian immigrants Giuseppe Frusoni and Erminia Bonucci. At the age of 24, he began to work at the Western Telegraph Company and changed later on to Italcable. In 1947, he managed the O Café Sport in Mindelo, the main city of São Vicente, where he presented poems and anecdotes in Crioulo. After that he went back to work for Italcable. In the 1960s, he conducted the theatre group Theatro do Castilho in Mindelo. For a number of years, he was chronicler at the radio Barlavento, where he produced the program Mosaico Mindelense in Crioulo.

Sérgio wrote many short stories and poems in the Creole of São Vicente (Criol d' Soncente). He died, aged 73, in Lisbon.  He is well known in Cape Verde, but almost unknown outside the island.

On June 7, 2005, Capeverdean president Pedro Pires paid homage to Sergio Frusoni and declared him as one of the greatest Crioulo poets.

Corsino Fortes described Frusoni in Paralelo 14 (Parallel 14)

Legacy
Some of his poems would be a part of the Tertúlia collection which featured poems made by other poets.  In 2004, it was performed in a play at the 10th Mindelo Theatrical Festival.

Works

Some famous poems and short stories

Chronicles in Crioulo
Mosaico Mindelense ("Mindelense Mosaic")

Short stories in Crioulo
 Contrabónde (short story) in Miscelânea luso-africana
 Na Tribunal
 Dum Bóca pa ôte
 Mute convérsa pa nada

Poems in Creole
 Contrabónde
 Pracinha
 Era um vêz um coquêr
 Presentaçôm 
 Pa diante ê qu’ê camin
 Flôr de Béla Sómbra
 Fonte de nha Sôdade, Lembróme
 Mnine d' Sanvicente
 Programa para meninos
 Marí Matchim
 Diante de mar de Sanvicente
 Sanvcênte já cabá na nada
 Sê Brinque
 Carta d'Angola
 Nha Chica
 Temp’ d’ Caniquinha (Um vêz Sanvcênt era sábe), 
 Sonnet in crioulo dedicated to Dr. Francisco Regala

Poems in English
 Sonnet

Poems in Portuguese
 In Mortis
 À Sogra
 Na Hora X
 A Marmita

Theatre
 Cuscujada - de Sérgio Frusoni

See also
 Manuel d'Novas
 Luís Romano de Madeira Melo
 Eugénio Tavares
 Germano Almeida

References

Further reading

Articles and columns
 Two poems (crioulo of São Vicente) in the literary journal ´ 'Claridade-Revista de Arte e Letras'  no.9-1966: Fonte de nha Sodade'  and Tempe Felix Textos Crioulos Cabo-Verdianos, published in  the book Miscelânea luso-africana, edited by Marius F. Valkhoff, (1975)
 Short story Contrabónde in Miscelânea luso-africana A Poética de Sérgio Frusoni: Uma Leitura Antropológica, a collection of Poems in the crioulo of São Vicente with Portuguese translation, collected by Mesquitela Lima, (1992)

Books
 Vangêle Contód d'nôs Móda, a translation of Bartolomeo Rossetti's Roman dialect New Testament into the Crioulo of São Vicente (1979)

External links
 Works by Sérgio Frusoni, mentioned by Manuel Lopes
 Poems by Sergio Frusoni at Islas de Cabo Verde
The poetic work of Sergio Frusoni: by Simone Caputo Gomes
Poem Temp d'Canequinha
Colá S. Jon: Este ritual é a "prenda má grande dum pôve e que tá fazê parte de sê vida"''
 Aspects of Biography of Sergio Frusoni
 Radio Barlavento
Rádio Clube do Mindelo
Mestiçagem moldou obra de Sérgio Frusoni by Pedro Pires (in Portuguese)
 Sermon d'montanha

1901 births
1975 deaths
Cape Verdean male writers
Writers in Cape Verdean Creole
People from Mindelo
Writers from São Vicente, Cape Verde